MV Cunard Ambassador was a cruise ship planned as one of a class of eight ships for the charter airline Overseas National Airways. At the same time, the Cunard Line was moving into the cruise market because the increasing popularity of international flights meant that its transatlantic passenger services were no longer viable.

Ship history

Because of the cost of the eight-ship project, Overseas National Airways soon ran into financial troubles and was forced to abandon it. Cunard saw the opportunity and quickly took the project on, soon reducing the order to two ships, which it christened Cunard Adventurer (1971) and Cunard Ambassador (1972).  Both ships were intended for seven-day cruises, including New York City to Bermuda, San Juan to other Caribbean ports, and Vancouver to Alaska during the summer seasons.

The two ships were less successful than intended. Cunard Adventurer was soon sold and became Sunward II and later Triton; Cunard Ambassador was withdrawn from Cunard service on September 12, 1974 after a fire on a positioning trip. There were no passengers on board and no fatalities but, after being towed to Key West, the ship was declared a total loss.

She was bought as a gutted hull and refitted to become the Danish sheep carrier, Linda Clausen later the same year. In 1980, she was sold again and became Procyon. In April 1981 she again caught fire, whilst bunkering in Singapore; the salvors Smit, SISEA and SELCO successfully fought the fire. The ship was again repaired and, in 1983, renamed Raslan.  In 1983, only a year after being rechristened Raslan, she suffered another devastating fire in the Indian Ocean. The former Cunard Ambassador was beyond economic repair and, after only thirteen years of service, two of which were with Cunard, she was sold to Taiwanese ship breakers and scrapped.

Influence
Shortly after the sale of Cunard Adventurer and the first fire on Cunard Ambassador, Cunard planned two new ships, Cunard Countess and Cunard Conquest, later changed to Cunard Princess. The design incorporated many features of the failed Adventurer and Ambassador including a similar sleek profile and angular funnel and the white-painted hull.

References

“Picture History of the Queen Mary and Queen Elizabeth”, William H. Miller Jr., Dover Publications Inc., 2004
“Picture History of the Cunard Line 1840–1990”, Frank O. Braynard and William H. Miller Jr., Dover Publications Inc., 1990
“Doomed Ships; Great Ocean Liner Disasters”, William H. Miller Jr., Dover Publications Inc., 2006

External links

Cruise ships
Ships built in Rotterdam
1972 ships
Ship fires
Ships of the Cunard Line